Thomas Marquis may refer to:

Thomas Bailey Marquis (1869–1935), American author, historian, and physician
Thomas Guthrie Marquis (1864–1936), Canadian author